Stan C. Mullis (born October 17, 1976) is an American professional stock car racing driver. He last competed part-time in the NASCAR Xfinity Series, driving the No. 13 Toyota Supra for MBM Motorsports.

Racing career

NASCAR Whelen All-American Series
Mullis regularly drives at Las Vegas Motor Speedway in the No. 20 Port City car with sponsorship from TLC Resorts Vacation Club.

NASCAR Xfinity Series
In 2017, Mullis made his NASCAR debut in the No. 40 Chevrolet Camaro for MBM Motorsports at Iowa. He started 39th and finished 32nd.

In 2018, Mullis returned to MBM Motorsports, but drove the No. 66 Chevrolet instead at Iowa. This time, he started 38th and finished 33rd.

He returned in 2019 with a best finish of 23rd at Iowa. 

In 2020, he made a one-off appearance at the season finale at Phoenix with MBM's No. 66.

Two years later, he would attempt the No. 13 for two races, but he failed to qualify for both of them.

Personal life
Outside of racing, Mullis is a businessman, and owns a vacation timeshare company called TLC Resorts which would later sponsor him in his Xfinity Series' races. The business first started in 2009.

Motorsports career results

NASCAR
(key) (Bold – Pole position awarded by qualifying time. Italics – Pole position earned by points standings or practice time. * – Most laps led.)

Xfinity Series

 Season still in progress
 Ineligible for series points

References

External links
 

Living people
1976 births
NASCAR drivers
Sportspeople from the Las Vegas Valley
Racing drivers from Nevada
Racing drivers from Las Vegas